Lev Oshanin  may refer to:
 Lev Vasilievich Oshanin (1884–1962), Soviet professor, doctor, anthropologist
 Lev Ivanovich Oshanin (1912–1996), Soviet Russian poet and song lyricist